The Speaker of the Chamber of Counties (literally the President of the Chamber of Counties of the Croatian Parliament) was the presiding officer of the Chamber of Counties, the upper chamber of the Croatian Parliament from 22 March 1993 until its abolition by constitution changes on 28 March 2001.

The Speaker of the Chamber of Counties was elected by a majority of the chamber's members for the duration of the parliamentary term. In the event of a dissolution of the chamber, the speaker would continue to serve until the inauguration of his or her successor. Only two individuals held the office of Speaker of the Chamber of Counties during its eight-year existence: Josip Manolić (1993–1994) and Katica Ivanišević (1994–2001). Katica Ivanišević remains the only woman to have served as Speaker of either chamber of Croatian Parliament. The office became defunct upon the passing of constitutional amendments by which the Chamber of Counties was abolished and the bicameral Croatian Parliament was replaced by a unicameral parliamentary system. The lower chamber, formally known as the Chamber of Representatives (Croatian: Zastupnički dom) thus became the only parliamentary chamber and became known simply as the Croatian Parliament.

List of speakers of the Chamber of Counties

Statistics

See also
President of Croatia
List of presidents of Croatia
Prime Minister of Croatia
List of Croatian prime ministers by time in office
Croatian Parliament#Chamber of Counties
Speaker of the Croatian Parliament

Politics of Croatia
Croatia, Chamber of Counties